Dr. David Fasenfest is an American sociologist and an associate professor at Wayne State University. He received his Ph.D. from the University of Michigan in 1984. He also holds a M.A. in economics and Chinese studies. A few of his research interests are urban sociology, race/class/gender, labor markets and workforce development, income inequality, and community economic development. He has been an active urban sociologist, editing and publishing several articles and books.

 Editor, Critical Sociology SAGE UK (July 1998 to present)
 Book Series Editor, Studies in Critical Social Sciences, Brill Academic Publishers, Leiden, NL (2003 to present)
 Executive Board, Citizens for a Sound Energy Future, Indianapolis, IN (January 2006 to December 2007)
 Board Member, Energy Future Institute, Indianapolis, IN (April 2006 to December 2007)

Publications

Books 

Engaging Social Justice: Critical Studies of 21st Century Social Transformation (Brill, 2009) (ed.) 
Power and Resistance: Intersecting Generations of Critical Social Science (Brill, 2009) (ed., with Richard Dello Buono)
Global Social Change: Movement Building and the Eclipse of Neoliberalism (Brill, 2009) (ed., with Graham Cassano)
Critical Evaluation of Local Development Policies (Wayne State University Press, 2004) (ed., with Laura Reese)
Community Economic Development: Policy Formation in the U.S. and U.K. (Macmillan Press, 1993)

References

External links
Critical Sociology
Association for Critical Sociology
Haymarket Book Series
Studies in Critical Social Sciences

American sociologists
Wayne State University faculty
University of Michigan College of Literature, Science, and the Arts alumni
Living people
Academic journal editors
German emigrants to the United States
Year of birth missing (living people)